In radiometry, radiant intensity is the radiant flux emitted, reflected, transmitted or received, per unit solid angle, and spectral intensity is the radiant intensity per unit frequency or wavelength, depending on whether the spectrum is taken as a function of frequency or of wavelength. These are directional quantities. The SI unit of radiant intensity is the watt per steradian, while that of spectral intensity in frequency is the watt per steradian per hertz and that of spectral intensity in wavelength is the watt per steradian per metre—commonly the watt per steradian per nanometre. Radiant intensity is distinct from irradiance and radiant exitance, which are often called intensity in branches of physics other than radiometry. In radio-frequency engineering, radiant intensity is sometimes called radiation intensity.

Mathematical definitions

Radiant intensity
Radiant intensity, denoted Ie,Ω ("e" for "energetic", to avoid confusion with photometric quantities, and "Ω" to indicate this is a directional quantity), is defined as

where
∂ is the partial derivative symbol;
Φe is the radiant flux emitted, reflected, transmitted or received;
Ω is the solid angle.

In general, Ie,Ω is a function of viewing angle θ and potentially azimuth angle. For the special case of a Lambertian surface, Ie,Ω follows the Lambert's cosine law Ie,Ω = I0 cos θ.

When calculating the radiant intensity emitted by a source, Ω refers to the solid angle into which the light is emitted. When calculating radiance received by a detector, Ω refers to the solid angle subtended by the source as viewed from that detector.

Spectral intensity
Spectral intensity in frequency, denoted Ie,Ω,ν, is defined as

where ν is the frequency.

Spectral intensity in wavelength, denoted Ie,Ω,λ, is defined as

where λ is the wavelength.

Radio-frequency engineering
Radiant intensity is used to characterize the emission of radiation by an antenna:

where
Ee is the irradiance of the antenna;
r is the distance from the antenna.

Unlike power density, radiant intensity does not depend on distance: because radiant intensity is defined as the power through a solid angle, the decreasing power density over distance due to the inverse-square law is offset by the increase in area with distance.

SI radiometry units

See also
Candela
Luminous intensity

References

External links
Radiation: Activity and Intensity NDE/NDT Resource Center

Physical quantities
Radiometry